Noah Webster Overstreet  (1888–1973) was an American architect in practice in Jackson, Mississippi from 1912 to 1968.

Life and career
Noah Webster Overstreet was born July 4, 1888, in Eastabuchie, Mississippi to Harvey Havard Overstreet and Bettie Flora Overstreet. He was educated in the Eastabuchie public school and at Mississippi State University before entering the architecture school of the University of Illinois with the class of 1910. Following graduation, he worked for two years in the office of Urbana, Illinois architect Joseph W. Royer.

In 1912 Overstreet moved back to Mississippi, settling in Jackson where he formed Overstreet & Spencer with Raymond B. Spencer. It lasted until they dissolved their partnership in 1914. Circa 1914 they briefly had a third partner and the firm was known as Overstreet, Spencer & Paine. After ending his partnership, Overstreet practiced independently in Jackson for about fifteen years. In 1931 he formed a new partnership, known as Overstreet & Town, with A. Hays Town. This was dissolved in 1939 when Town returned to his native state of Louisiana. This was succeeded by Noah Webster Overstreet & Associates which in turn was succeeded in 1955 by the firm of Overstreet, Ware & Ware with brothers Joseph T. Ware and John M. Ware. A fourth partner, Edwin R. Lewis, was added in 1962. Overstreet formally retired from the firm effective December 31, 1968, which was succeeded by the Ware, Lewis Partnership on January 1. It was later known as Ware, Lewis & Eaton and as the Lewis–Eaton Partnership. In 1969 it had been acquired by Reynolds, Smith & Hills of Jacksonville, Florida and was a subsidiary of that firm until its dissolution in 1985. The best known work of the successor firm is the Charlotte Capers Archives and History Building in Jackson, begun in 1969 and completed in 1971.

Overstreet joined the American Institute of Architects in 1922. He was instrumental in the founding of the Mississippi chapter in 1929 and served as its first president. In 1952 he was elected a Fellow of the American Institute of Architects, the first Mississippi architect to be so honored.

By the time of his election to fellowship Overstreet was the acknowledged leader of the architectural profession in Mississippi. He was well known as an architect of public and institutional buildings, including churches, courthouses and schools.

Personal life
Overstreet was married in 1912 to Mabel Kinnear in Urbana. They had three children: Noah Webster Overstreet Jr., Robert Kinnear Overstreet and Patricia Ann (Overstreet) Kitchings. Robert K. Overstreet was also an architect and worked for his father in Jackson from 1946 to 1952 before moving to San Francisco. He was the partner of Elmer E. Botsai from 1963 to 1979.

In addition to his professional affiliations Overstreet was a member of the Chamber of Commerce, the Kappa Alpha Order and the Newcomen Society of the United States. He was a member of the Baptist church.

Overstreet died October 12, 1973, in Jackson at the age of 85.

Legacy
Overstreet's work was concentrated in Mississippi, but he also designed buildings in Arkansas, Georgia and Louisiana. At least eight of his and his partners' works have been listed on the United States National Register of Historic Places, and others contribute to listed historic districts or are designated Mississippi Landmarks.

Architectural works
 C. H. Parsons house, Crystal Springs, Mississippi (1912, NRHP 1984)
 Franklin County Courthouse, Meadville, Mississippi (1913–14, NRHP 1981)
 Jackson Public Library, Jackson, Mississippi (1913–14, demolished)
 YMCA Building, Mississippi State University, Starkville, Mississippi (1914–15)
 Mississippi Building, Panama–Pacific International Exposition, San Francisco, California (1915, temporary building demolished 1916)
 Webster County Courthouse, Walthall, Mississippi (1915–16, burned and demolished 2013)
 Harrison County Courthouse, Gulfport, Mississippi (1916–17, demolished)
 Pontotoc County Courthouse, Pontotoc, Mississippi (1916)
 Alcorn County Courthouse, Corinth, Mississippi (1918–19)
 Remodeling of the First Presbyterian Church, Louisville, Mississippi (1920)
 Central Presbyterian Church (former), Jackson, Mississippi (1922)
 Inverness High School (former), Inverness, Mississippi (1922, demolished 2010)
 Shaw High School, Shaw, Mississippi (1922)
 Bolivar County Courthouse, Cleveland, Mississippi (1923–24)
 Canton High School, Canton, Mississippi (1923 and 1938, NRHP 1998)
 Gulfport High School (former), Gulfport, Mississippi (1923)
 Lamar Life Insurance Company Building, Jackson, Mississippi (1923–24)
 First Baptist Church, Jackson, Mississippi (1924–27)
 Mississippi Fire Insurance Company Building, Jackson, Mississippi (1924)
 Rankin County Courthouse, Brandon, Mississippi (1924–25, NRHP 1997)
 Scott County Courthouse, Forest, Mississippi (1924, demolished 1955)
 Gordon Hotel, Albany, Georgia (1925)
 Hotel Chester, Starkville, Mississippi (1925, NRHP 1985)
 Monticello Consolidated School, Monticello, Mississippi (1925–26, NRHP 1991)
 Prentiss County Courthouse, Booneville, Mississippi (1925–26)
 Additions to the Marshall County Courthouse, Holly Springs, Mississippi (1926)
 Winona High School, Winona, Mississippi (1926)
 George Hurst Building, University of Southern Mississippi, Hattiesburg, Mississippi (1927)
 Tippah County Courthouse, Ripley, Mississippi (1928)
 Plaza Building, Jackson, Mississippi (1929)
 Bloom's Arcade, Tallulah, Louisiana (1930, NRHP 1989)
 Lake Village Baptist Church, Lake Village, Arkansas (1931)
 North Church Primary School, Tupelo, Mississippi (1936–38, NRHP 1992)
 Columbia High School, Columbia, Mississippi (1937–38)
 Addition to the St. James Parish Courthouse, Convent, Louisiana (1939, burned and demolished 1970)
 Choctaw County Courthouse, Ackerman, Mississippi (1941)
 Columbia Primary School, Columbia, Mississippi (1951)
 George L. Hawkins Elementary School, Hattiesburg, Mississippi (1951)
 Fondren Corner, Jackson, Mississippi (1955–56)
 Terminal, Jackson–Medgar Wiley Evers International Airport, Jackson, Mississippi (1959–63, altered)
 Alexander Hall, Jackson State University, Jackson, Mississippi (1960–63)
 University Baptist Church, Hattiesburg, Mississippi (1960)

Notes

References

Architects from Mississippi
20th-century American architects
Fellows of the American Institute of Architects
Mississippi State University alumni
University of Illinois School of Architecture alumni
People from Jackson, Mississippi
1888 births
1973 deaths